William David MacAskill (born 24 March 1987) is a Scottish philosopher and author, as well as one of the originators of the effective altruism movement. He is an Associate Professor in Philosophy and Research Fellow at the Global Priorities Institute at the University of Oxford and Director of the Forethought Foundation for Global Priorities Research. He co-founded Giving What We Can, the Centre for Effective Altruism and 80,000 Hours, and he is the author of the 2015 book Doing Good Better, the 2022 book What We Owe the Future and co-author of the 2020 book Moral Uncertainty.

Early life and education 

MacAskill was born William Crouch in 1987 and grew up in Glasgow. He was educated at Hutchesons' Grammar School in Glasgow. At the age of 15, after learning about how many people were dying as a result of AIDS, he made the decision to work towards becoming wealthy and giving away half of his money. At the age of 18, MacAskill read Peter Singer's 1972 essay "Famine, Affluence, and Morality", which motivated his philosophical and charitable interests. 

MacAskill earned his BA in philosophy at Jesus College, Cambridge in 2008 and BPhil at St Edmund Hall, Oxford in 2010. He then took up a junior research fellowship at Emmanuel College, Cambridge, before taking an associate professorship at Lincoln College, Oxford.

Career

Charities 

In 2009, MacAskill and fellow Oxford graduate student Toby Ord co-founded the organisation Giving What We Can to encourage people to pledge to donate 10% of their income to effective charities. He co-founded the Centre for Effective Altruism in 2011 as an umbrella organisation of Giving What We Can and 80,000 Hours, which he co-founded with Benjamin Todd, to provide advice on how to use your career to do the most good in the world. In 2018, MacAskill gave a TED talk on effective altruism at the TED conference in Vancouver.

As of 2023, MacAskill continues his charitable work as Chair of the Advisory Board at the Global Priorities Institute at the University of Oxford and Director of the Forethought Foundation for Global Priorities Research. He is an advisor to Longview Philanthropy. 

He was associated with Samuel Bankman-Fried for a number of years and supported Bankman-Fried against an effort in 2018 to oust him from control of the now-failed trading firm Alameda Research despite being made aware of claims that Bankman-Fried was engaging in inappropriate conduct. He benefited from his association with FTX and he was a member of Samuel Bankman-Fried's FTX Future Fund, which granted $160 million to effective altruism causes in 2022, including $33 million to organizations directly connected to MacAskill. Following the bankruptcy of FTX, MacAskill and the rest of the team resigned from the fund.

Research 

One of the main focuses of MacAskill's research has been how one ought to make decisions under normative uncertainty; this was the topic of his DPhil thesis, as well as articles in Ethics, Mind and The Journal of Philosophy.

Books

Doing Good Better 

MacAskill's first book, Doing Good Better, was published in 2015. MacAskill argues that many of the ways people think about doing good achieve very little, but that by applying data and scientific reasoning to the doing good, one can have a much larger positive impact. For example, the book proposes that fair trade does very little to help the poorest farmers, that boycotting sweatshops is bad for the global poor, and that people who pursue high-income careers could do more good than charity workers by donating large portions of their wealth to effective charities, i.e. earning to give. However, in the same year the book was published, MacAskill deemphasised earning to give saying "only a small proportion of people should earn to give long term".

What We Owe the Future 

MacAskill's second book, What We Owe the Future, makes the case for longtermism. His argument has three parts: first, future people count morally as much as the people alive today; second, the future is immense because humanity may survive for a very long time; and third, the future could be very good or very bad, and our actions could make the difference. The book also discusses how bad the end of humanity would be, which depends on whether the future will be good or bad and whether it is morally good for happy people to be born—a key question in population ethics. He concludes that the future will likely be positive on balance if humanity survives.

Role in Twitter acquisition talks 

In 2022, as tech magnate Elon Musk sought funding for his purchase of Twitter, MacAskill liaisoned between Musk and Bankman-Fried. Musk and MacAskill were previously acquainted; Musk described What We Owe the Future as "a close match for my philosophy". MacAskill contacted Musk to arrange a conversation with Bankman-Fried, describing him as "my collaborator". Ultimately, Bankman-Fried, whose corporate ventures were facing shortfalls that were not yet publicized, did not participate in the acquisition.

Personal life 

MacAskill (born Crouch) argued that men should consider changing their last names when they get married. He and his now ex-wife, Amanda Askell, changed their last name to "MacAskill", her maternal grandmother's maiden name. MacAskill and his former wife authored articles together on topics of ethical debate before their separation in 2015 and later divorce.

MacAskill has experienced both anxiety and depression. Out of concern for animal welfare, he is a vegetarian. As of 2022, MacAskill lives in Oxford.

Publications 

 What We Owe the Future. Basic Books, 2022. .
 Doing Good Better: Effective Altruism and a Radical Way to Make a Difference. London: Guardian Faber, 2015. .
 with Krister Bykvist and Toby Ord. Moral Uncertainty. Oxford: Oxford University Press, 2020. .
 with Darius Meissner and Richard Yetter Chappell. Utilitarianism.net — an introductory online textbook on utilitarianism.

References

External links 
 
 TED talk: What are the most important problems of our time? (April, 2018)

1987 births
21st-century essayists
21st-century non-fiction writers
21st-century Scottish male writers
21st-century Scottish philosophers
Academics from Glasgow
Alumni of Jesus College, Cambridge
Alumni of St Anne's College, Oxford
Alumni of St Edmund Hall, Oxford
Analytic philosophers
Anti-poverty advocates
Contemporary philosophers
Founders of charities
Freethought writers
Futurologists
Living people
People associated with effective altruism
People associated with the University of Oxford
People educated at Hutchesons' Grammar School
People from Glasgow
Philosophers of culture
Philosophers of economics
Philosophers of history
Philosophers of mind
Philosophers of science
Philosophers of social science
Philosophy academics
Philosophy writers
Probability theorists
Scottish essayists
Scottish ethicists
Scottish non-fiction writers
Scottish philosophers
Scottish political philosophers
Textbook writers
Theorists on Western civilization
Utilitarians
Writers about activism and social change
Writers about globalization
Writers from Glasgow